Scituate is the name of some communities in New England in the United States:

Brunswick, Maine, formerly named Scituate
Scituate, Massachusetts, a New England town
Scituate (CDP), Massachusetts, an area in the town of Scituate
Scituate, Rhode Island, named after the town in Massachusetts

See also 
North Scituate (disambiguation)
Scituate High School (disambiguation)